Miss Malaysia 1965, the 2nd edition of the Miss Universe Malaysia, was held on 12 June 1965 at the Merdeka Stadium, Kuala Lumpur. Patricia Augustus of Penang was crowned by the outgoing titleholder, Angela Filmer of Selangor at the end of the event. She then represented Malaysia at the Miss Universe 1965 pageant in Miami, Florida.

Results

Delegates 
14 delegates from each states competed for the title.
  - Jenny Lim Poh Choo
  - Kamaliah Binte Sa'ad
  - Rohani Salleh
  - Anom Binte Kamal
  - Joyce Lim
  - Shirley Wong
  - Patricia Augustus
 - Saadiah Ahmad
  - Helen Lee Ling
  - Shirley Cheng
  - Nancy Blassan
  - Clara De Run
  - Alice Woon
  - Hasnah Binte Yunus

State Pageants 

Miss Johore 1965
Winner - Jenny Lim
1st Runner-up - Suzanna Looh
2nd Runner-up - Shirley Leong

Miss Negri Sembilan 1965
Winner - Joyce Lim
1st Runner-up - Wan Mariam Wan Ibrahim
2nd Runner-up - Jane Foong

Miss Perak Universe 1965
Winner - Helen Lee Ling
1st Runner-up - Zainab Mohamed Salleh
2nd Runner-up - Margaret Ong

Miss Sarawak Universe 1965
Winner - Nancy Blassan
1st Runner-up - Elizabeth Ong
2nd Runner-up - Fatimah Abdul Rahman

Miss Selangor Universe 1965
Winner - Clara De Run
1st Runner-up - Canny Moo
2nd Runner-up - Adriane Lim

Miss Singapore Universe 1965
Winner - Alice Woon
1st Runner-up - Yvonne Wee
2nd Runner-up - Nandaria Roop

Notes 

 The 2nd Runner-up Clara De Run of Selangor later then competed in the national pageant of Miss Malaysia World 1965 which was also held at the Merdeka Stadium, Kuala Lumpur and eventually won. She then represented Malaysia at the Miss World 1965.
 Singapore was still apart of Malaysia until separated in August 9, 1965.

References

External links 

1965 in Malaysia
1965 beauty pageants
1965
Beauty pageants in Malaysia